The Battle of Tlemcen occuured at sea 10 km away from the shores of Tlemcen between the Republic of Genoa and Banu thabit and ended in Banu thabit victory and Genoese stopped attack Tripolitana trade ships .

Opposing forces
The numbers are not clear but Genoa probably had larger numbers considering the corsairs, while Banu thabit were still developing their naval force and most of the navy was still sieging Djerba.

Aftermath
The Genoese stopped practising piracy on tripoli trade ship, while the Banu thabit were able to establish economic and military power over the Mediterranean Sea.

References

Naval battles